Ephraim Lerkin (born 27 November 1997) is a Papua New Guinean track and field athlete. He competed at the 2017 World Championships running in the men's 400 metres hurdles. He competed in the same event at the 2018 Commonwealth Games in the Australia, where he ran 52.17 seconds without advancing to the final.

References

External links
 

1997 births
Living people
Papua New Guinean male hurdlers
Athletes (track and field) at the 2018 Commonwealth Games
Commonwealth Games competitors for Papua New Guinea